Bernardinuscollege is a school in Heerlen, the Netherlands. The school was founded by Franciscan friars in 1903 as a monastery, that was later converted to a Hogere Burgerschool, because of the need for education in the wake of the blooming mining industry. In September 1913 the first students arrived.

History
Sint-Bernardinus was expanded with a midlevel-business school and in 1919 the 3-year HBS (Higher Citizen School) course was changed to a 5-year one. In 1930 the school was further expanded with a Gymnasium.

In 1970 the 'Sint' was dropped from the school name, giving it its current name: Bernardinuscollege.

Bernardinuscollege is part of SVOPL together with Charlemagne College, Herlecollege, Praktijkonderwijs Parkstad Limburg, and Sintermeertencollege.

In 2009, Bernardinuscollege did not accept any new vmbo-t students. From that moment on, only havo, atheneum and gymnasium students are accepted. In 2013, Bernardinuscollege launched the Technasium, a more technical oriented study, which adds the subject O&O ('Onderzoek en oriëntatie' - Research and orientation) to the profiles of Atheneum and Gymnasium students. In early 2014, Bernardinuscollege was certified as a Vecon Businessschool, which allows them to give out an extra certificate to students when they finish their Economy exams.

Notable people

Students 
Jan Hanlo (1912–1969), poet and author
Jo Ritzen (b. 1945), Minister of Education
Frans Timmermans (b. 1961), Minister of Foreign Affairs, First Vice-President of the European Commission

Teachers 
Peter Winkels (1954–2021), writer and television presenter

Gallery

References

External links
 Main website Bernardinuscollege

Educational institutions established in 1911
1911 establishments in the Netherlands
Christian schools in the Netherlands
Secondary schools in the Netherlands
Schools in Limburg (Netherlands)
Buildings and structures in Heerlen